Nils Røsholt (born 27 May 1949) is a Norwegian politician for the Centre Party.

He served as a deputy representative to the Norwegian Parliament from Vestfold during the term 1993–1997.

On the local level Røsholt was the mayor of Lardal municipality from 2003 to 2007.

References

1949 births
Living people
Deputy members of the Storting
Centre Party (Norway) politicians
Mayors of places in Vestfold
Place of birth missing (living people)
20th-century Norwegian politicians
21st-century Norwegian politicians